Tikhov is an impact crater in the Hellas quadrangle on Mars at 50.7°S and 105.8°E. It is  in diameter. Its name was approved in 1973 by the International Astronomical Union (IAU) Working Group for Planetary System Nomenclature, and it was named after Russian astronomer Gavriil Adrianovich Tikhov.

The crater Wallace is located to the southeast of Tikhov, and the larger crater Secchi is to the southwest.

References 

Impact craters on Mars
Hellas quadrangle